Square Enix Collective is an indie games awareness initiative and division of Square Enix Europe. Created by Phil Elliot in 2014, it is a self-titled "service provider for Indie developers", which helps get a developer's game published while they maintain their creative control.

History
First announced in November 2013 at Game Developers Conference Next, former Eidos Interactive intellectual properties (IPs) including Fear Effect, Gex and Anachronox, are potentially available for developers. In 2016, the process for developers interested in working with the Collective was the following: developers would submit a pitch to the company on a rolling basis. The pitches would then be presented to the public through the Collective's website, and a polling process would take place once a week, with anyone welcome to vote on the projects that excited them. While the polling process was not the sole determinate for which developers the Collective would assist, it played a pivotal role. Square Enix took five percent of the games revenue after fees. Originally Collective partnered with Indiegogo for crowdfunding.

Between founding and 2019, campaigns for 167 games were run, Kickstarter fundraising was promoted and 12 games were published. Notable games which had campaigns include Moonlighter, Ultimate Chicken Horse and Moon Hunters.

In October 2018, the company announced they would be closing their platform for campaign curation, instead focusing on larger and specific products without the element of public polling.

Games published

References

Square Enix
Video game publishing brands